The Power is a 2021 Indian Hindi-language action thriller film written and directed by Mahesh Manjrekar. It stars Vidyut Jammwal, Shruti Haasan, Zakir Hussain, Prateik Babbar, Sachin Khedekar and Jisshu Sengupta. The film was released on the online streaming service Zee Plex on 14 January 2021.

The film received mixed reviews from critics, who praised the cast performances, action sequences and editing, but criticism for its pace, writing and direction.

Premise 
An attempt is made on the life of a crime boss Kaalidas Haridas Thakur, who refuses to strike a deal. However, the assassination goes wrong, resulting in the killing of an innocent man Anwar, and igniting a blood feud. Pari, Anwar's daughter swears to avenge her father's death by annihilating the Thakur clan where she sides with Thakur rival Vishambhar Rana.

Cast
Vidyut Jammwal as Devidas Thakur
Shruti Haasan as Parveen / Pari
Zakir Hussain as Anwar
Sachin Khedekar as Vishambhar Rana
Sonal Chauhan as Chandini
Jisshu Sengupta as Ramdas Thakur
Mahesh Manjrekar as Kaalidas Haridas Thakur
Medha Manjrekar as Uma Kaalidas Thakur
Prateik Babbar as Ranjeet Venkat Shankarnarayanan
Mrunmayee Deshpande as Ratna Thakur
Sudhanshu Pandey as Rocky
Yuvika Chaudhary as Shaila Thakur
Salil Ankola as Robert
Sameer Dharmadhikari as Francis Dcosta
Chetan Hansraj as Fakira
Aham Sharma as Charlie
Vidyadhar Joshi as Bhau
Savita Malpekar as Thakur's Maid
Ganesh Yadav as Potya

Reception
Anna M. M. Vetticad said that the film is "engaging to begin with, but as it rolls along, it becomes clear that it falls in the ‘if you’ve seen one, you’ve seen ’em all’ category of underworld dramas." Pallabi Dey Purkayastha of The Times of India gave a rating of 2.5 stars out if 5 stars and wrote: "With a tighter, finer screenplay and more consistent performers, ‘The Power’ could have been a befitting response of this decade to the Sarkar franchise but a lacklustre narrative, among other things, brings the power down to level zero." Samrudhi Ghosh of Hindustan Times wrote: "The Power, with its creative bankruptcy, brings nothing new to already done-to-death iterations of The Godfather. Joginder Tuteja of Rediff.com noted, "If the film had been crisper with solid drama in the second half too, The Power could have been more powerful."

Music 

The music for the film was composed by Salim–Sulaiman with lyrics written by Kumaar . The single "Oh Saaiyaan" was sung by Arijit Singh and Raj Pandit while the female version was sung by Aishwarya Pandit

References

External links

The Power at ZEE5

2021 films
2021 direct-to-video films
Films not released in theaters due to the COVID-19 pandemic
2020s Hindi-language films
Indian direct-to-video films
Indian action thriller films
2021 action thriller films
Films directed by Mahesh Manjrekar